Whirlybird may refer to:

 Helicopter (slang)
 Whirlybirds, a television program that aired in the United States from 1957 to 1960

 Attic fan (slang and brand name)
 Samara (fruit) (slang), the fruit of a maple tree
 Paper fortune teller, a form of origami
 Power trowel (slang), light construction equipment 
 "Whirlybird", a jazz tune written by Neal Hefti featured on the Count Basie album The Atomic Mr. Basie
 "Whirlybird", a British company founded in 2000, designing and manufacturing plastic model kits and accessories
 Whirlybird, a game in Google Play Games